The Craigtoun Park Railway is a  gauge railway operating on a circular track around part of the Craigtoun Country Park in St Andrews, Fife, Scotland.

The gauge employed is usually associated with more extensive railway operations, including public transport services on railways such as the Romney, Hythe and Dymchurch Railway in Kent, England.

The rolling stock, all built by Severn Lamb, consists of two open and one semi-open 'toast-rack' carriages, with motive power provided by a  steam-outline locomotive built in 1973, designed to resemble a steam locomotive of the Denver and Rio Grande Western Railroad.

The  gauge railway has been running at Craigtoun since 1976.

External links
 Craigtoun Park Railway on Miniature Railway World
 Craigtoun Country Park

Miniature railways in the United Kingdom
15 in gauge railways in Scotland